Rhampholeon gorongosae, the Mount Gorongosa pygmy chameleon, is a species of chameleon endemic to Mozambique.

References

Rhampholeon
Reptiles described in 1971
Taxa named by Donald George Broadley]
Reptiles of Mozambique